The Scarlet Crystal is a 1917 American silent crime drama film directed by Charles Swickard and starring Herbert Rawlinson, Betty Schade, and Dorothy Davenport.

Cast
 Herbert Rawlinson as Vincent Morgan
 Betty Schade as Priscilla Worth
 Dorothy Davenport as Marie Delys
 Raymond Whitaker as Maxfield Durant
 Marie Hazelton as Peggy Lovel
 Gertrude Astor as Helen Forbes
 Dick Ryan as Billy Van Duyn
 Edith Johnson
 Nicholas Dunaew

References

Bibliography
James Robert Parish & Michael R. Pitts. Film directors: a Guide to their American films. Scarecrow Press, 1974.

External links
 

1917 films
1917 crime films
American silent feature films
American crime films
American black-and-white films
Universal Pictures films
Films directed by Charles Swickard
1910s English-language films
1910s American films